Laura Unternährer  (born ) is a Swiss female volleyball player. With her club Voléro Zürich she competed at the 2013, 2014 and 2015 FIVB Volleyball Women's Club World Championship.

References

External links
http://www.cev.lu/competition-area/PlayerDetails.aspx?TeamID=10114&PlayerID=6440&ID=968
http://www.blick.ch/sport/volleyball/einblick-in-eine-volley-wg-im-schaumbad-mit-voleros-unternaehrer-id2642834.html

1993 births
Living people
Swiss women's volleyball players
Place of birth missing (living people)